Cinnamon was a Swedish indie pop band active from 1994 to 2000 and often compared to The Cardigans and Saint Etienne.

History
Cinnamon was founded in 1993 by songwriters Jiri Novak and Frida Diesen, who had been making music together in different constellations since 1992. The duo were soon joined by Samuel Laxberg and Christian Ekwall and, later, Per Linden. In 1994, they signed with Soap Records, and their debut EP Vox was released 1995. This was followed the same year by their first album, Summer Meditation (with some co-production from Graham Lewis). Their 1997 album The Courier was accompanied by a tour of Europe and the United States. The Many Moods EP appeared in June 1999, followed in October by the album Vertigo on Apricot Records. The album was mixed by producer Bertrand Burgalat and was a success. Their final release was the 1999 EP Against the World, containing two cuts from Vertigo and three new songs, which was followed by a 2000 tour.

Discography

Albums
Summer Meditation (Soap, 1995)
A Northwest Passage (Soap, 1996)
Courier (Island / Polygram, 1997)
Vertigo (Apricot, 2000)

Extended plays
Vox (Soap, 1995)
Hopeless Case (Soap, 1996)
Springtime of My Life (Soap, 1999)
The Many Moods of Cinnamon (March, 1999)
Against the World (Labrador, 1999)

References

External links
Allmusic page

Swedish pop music groups